Volar (also Romanized as Volār, Ulyar, Ular, Wulāṟ) is a town in Badakhshan Province, Afghanistan.

See also
Badakhshan Province

References

Populated places in Badakhshan Province